Kamal Kumari Barooah (Assamese: কমল কুমাৰী বৰুৱা) (1899–1978) was the matriarch of the Khongiya Barooah family of Thengal, Assam. She was born to Mahendranath Mahanta and Swarnalata Mahanta at Borelengi Satra. In 1917, she married Siva Prasad Barooah of Khongiya Barooah family, the family that emerged as the champion of Assamese interests and repository of Assamese culture and traditions. Noted Indian entrepreneur, tea planter and philanthropist Hemendra Prasad Barooah was her son.

After her husband's death in 1938, she had to handle the huge Thengal household alone, starting from running their tea-gardens to retaining the family properties for her children. In order to run their businesses, she educated herself in English as well as in tea craft.

K K Foundation

The Kamal Kumari Foundation was instituted in her fond memory in 1990. It has been conferring the Kamal Kumari National Award since 1991 to individual or group for outstanding contributions to the field of Art, Culture & Literature and Science & Technology. The other award the foundation has been conferring is the Siva Prasad Barooah National Award in journalism.

See also
Siva Prasad Barooah
The Kamal Kumari Foundation
Kamal Kumari National Award

References

External links
Official website
Kamal Kumari awards announced

People from Nagaon district
Indian humanists
Indian planters
1899 births
1978 deaths
Businesswomen from Assam
Businesspeople from Assam
20th-century Indian businesspeople
20th-century Indian businesswomen
20th-century Indian philanthropists